Almaden may refer to:

Places

United States
Almaden Valley, San Jose, California
Almaden Mine, an alternate name for New Almaden Quicksilver Mine
IBM Almaden Research Center, San Jose
Almaden Air Force Station, a former US Air Force station
Almaden station, a light rail station in San Jose
Old Almaden Winery, a park in Santa Clara County, California

Other places
Almaden, Queensland, Australia
Almadén, a town in Spain notable for its mercury mines

Other uses
Almaden Vineyards, a wine producer owned by Constellation Brands